Sergio Casal and Emilio Sánchez were the defending champions, but lost in the second round to Francisco Clavet and Horst Skoff.

Javier Sánchez and Éric Winogradsky won the title by defeating Clavet and Skoff 7–6, 6–2 in the final.

Seeds
All seeds received a bye to the second round.

Draw

Finals

Top half

Bottom half

References

External links
 Official results archive (ATP)
 Official results archive (ITF)

Doubles
Austrian Open Kitzbühel